Qabaq Tappeh-ye Kord (also Romanized as Qābāq Tappeh-ye Kord; also known as Ghabagh Tappeh Mehraban, Qābākh Tappah, Qābāq Tappeh, and Qapaq Tepe) is a village in Gol Tappeh Rural District, Gol Tappeh District, Kabudarahang County, Hamadan Province, Iran. It had 628 residents, in 142 families, at the time of the 2006 Census.

References 

Populated places in Kabudarahang County